Semma Botha Aagathey is a 2018 Indian Tamil-language action thriller film  directed by Badri Venkatesh, with dialogues written by G. Radhakrishnan.  The film stars Atharvaa, who also produces the film, alongside Mishti and Anaika Soti. Featuring music composed by Yuvan Shankar Raja, the film began production during January 2016 and was released in India on 29 June 2018.

Plot
The movie begins with Ramesh (Atharvaa) waking up in a hangover and remembering the events of the previous day. After a breakup with his girlfriend Madhu (Mishti), he is sad and drinks a lot along with his friend Nandhu (Karunakaran). On his advice, Ramesh calls for a female escort and sneaks her into his apartment. Ramesh has to step out of his house due to his neighbor Devi's (Devadarshini) emergency situation. He asks the escort, Nina (Anaika Soti), to wait inside his house, promising to come back soon. While he returns, he finds that she is dead under mysterious circumstances. Ramesh is shocked and tries to find details about her. He sees restaurant receipts in her bag, checks the CCTV footages, and finds that another man named Ravi (Prinz Nithik) had accompanied her prior to her meeting him. From her cell phone, he finds her house address, travels to Palakkad, and asks Nandhu to stay behind and guard the dead body. He is not able to find any information from Nina's family and leaves, but Nina's sister makes a call to Sekar (John Vijay) and informs him about Ramesh.

Sekar tracks Ramesh down and asks about Nina and Ravi. He says Ravi was a henchman and had usurped money and documents from the politician for whom he was working for. Ramesh escapes from Sekar. Nandhu calls him with information about a series of numbers that he found from Nina's purse and also says that he is hiding with the dead body in the attic because of Ramesh's intruding neighbors - Devi's father (Manobala) and husband Ram (Chetan), who came to use his gas stove for emergency purposes and would not leave. Ramesh goes to a railway station to find that the cloak room lockers are the series of numbers that Nina had noted down. He sees Ravi opening the lockers, beats him up, and asks why he killed Nina. Ravi says that he escaped with his boss's money and had picked up Nina to escort him. During his stay with her, fake police threatened and looted all the money. He finds that all of this was part of Nina's plan and that she had taken the money, hid it in the lockers and left for Chennai. Ravi found her, and after getting information about the money's location, he poisoned her drink as revenge. It is then that Ramesh had met Nina and she, unfortunately, ended up dying at his apartment.

After recording Ravi's confession, Ramesh strikes a deal with him that he should get rid of Nina's body from his house and takes him in his car. Ravi tries to escape, and after a chase, falls to his death. Disappointed, Ramesh returns to Chennai and plans to dispose of the dead body himself. Along with Nandhu, he drives Nina's body to the place where Ravi died. Keeping both of the dead people together along with the money, he informs Sekar of the whereabouts of Ravi, Nina, and the money. Sekar comes to the location, takes back his boss's money, and disposes of both Ravi and Nina's bodies.

Finally relieved of all the unwanted trouble, Ramesh and Nandhu get back to their homes in Chennai. Ramesh patches up with Madhu when Nandhu informs him that Sekar and his men died in a road accident. Ramesh and Nandhu are overjoyed because there is no living proof now of their unwitting involvement in Ravi and Nina's murders.

Cast

Atharvaa as Ramesh
Mishti as Madhu
Anaika Soti as Nina
Karunakaran as Nandhu
John Vijay as Sekar
Prinz Nithik as Ravi
Devadarshini as Devi
Chetan as Ram
Manobala as Devi's father
Yogi Babu as Soosai
M. S. Bhaskar as Kunjunni
Aadukalam Naren as Varghese
G. K. Reddy as Annachi
Gayathri
Iti Acharya as Bindhu

Production
On 1 January 2016, Atharvaa launched a new productions studio named Kickass Entertainment and revealed that he produce a film directed by Badri Venkatesh, who had introduced him in films through Baana Kaathadi (2010). In a turn of events a week later, Atharvaa revealed that he would portray the lead role himself. In April 2016, actresses Mishti and Anaika Soti joined the film's cast, as did John Vijay and Karunakaran. The film was shot across early 2016 in Tamil Nadu and Kerala.

Soundtrack

 
The soundtrack of Semma Botha Aagathey consists of five songs composed and arranged by Yuvan Shankar Raja.

Release
Tamil Nadu theatrical rights of the film were sold for 4.5 crore. The satellite rights of the film were bagged by Raj TV.

References

External links
 

2018 films
2010s Tamil-language films
2018 masala films
Indian action thriller films
2018 action thriller films